West Bronx Academy for the Future is a small school located within Roosevelt Educational Campus, across the street from Fordham University.

External links
 Page on NYC DOE website
 Listing on insideschools.org
 School website

Public high schools in the Bronx
Public middle schools in the Bronx
Belmont, Bronx